The following low-power television stations broadcast on digital or analog channel 7 in the United States:

 K07AQ in Kamiah, Idaho
 K07BW-D in Westcliffe, Colorado
 K07CG-D in Toquerville, Utah
 K07CH-D in Plains & Paradise, Montana
 K07DI-D in Hinsdale, Montana
 K07DU-D in Ely & McGill, Nevada
 K07DV-D in Ruth, Nevada
 K07ED-D in Enterprise, Utah
 K07EJ-D in Townsend, Montana
 K07EN-D in Woods Bay/Lakeside, Montana
 K07EQ-D in Ekalaka, Montana
 K07FL-D in Thompson Falls, Montana
 K07GI-D in Prospect, Oregon
 K07GJ-D in Hoopa, California
 K07GQ-D in Cedar City, Utah
 K07HM-D in Big Piney, etc., Wyoming
 K07HS-D in Williams, Oregon
 K07IB-D in Whitewater, Montana
 K07IC-D in Malta, Montana
 K07IT-D in West Glacier, etc., Montana
 K07JG-D in Glasgow, Montana
 K07JO-D in Chelan Butte, Washington
 K07JS-D in North Bend, Oregon
 K07JT-D in Brookings, Oregon
 K07KF-D in Thomasville, Colorado
 K07NL-D in Juliaetta, Idaho
 K07NR-D in Lakeview, etc., Oregon
 K07NU-D in White Sulphur Springs, Montana
 K07OC-D in Polaris, Montana
 K07OJ-D in Snowflake, Arizona
 K07OL-D in Kipnuk, Alaska
 K07PA-D in Manitou Springs, Colorado
 K07PB-D in Thayne, etc., Wyoming
 K07PF-D in Homer, Alaska
 K07PZ-D in Cave Junction, Oregon
 K07QC-D in Driggs, Idaho
 K07QD-D in Hooper Bay, Alaska
 K07QX-D in Golovin, Alaska
 K07RB-D in Tanana, Alaska
 K07RD-D in Savoonga, Alaska
 K07RJ-D in Holy Cross, Alaska
 K07RK-D in St. Marys, Alaska
 K07RU-D in Dot Lake, Alaska
 K07RY-D in Chignik, Alaska
 K07SS-D in Angoon, Alaska
 K07ST-D in Women's Bay, Alaska
 K07TH-D in Lime Village, Alaska
 K07TK-D in Marshall, Alaska
 K07UY-D in Cortez, Colorado
 K07VA-D in Jordan, Montana
 K07VY-D in The Dalles, Oregon
 K07WJ-D in Colstrip, Montana
 K07WP-D in Roundup, Montana
 K07XL-D in Mountain Home, Arkansas
 K07XM-D in Mink Creek, Idaho
 K07YJ-D in Bullhead City, Arizona
 K07YV-D in The Dalles, Oregon
 K07ZE-D in Rural Juab, etc., Utah
 K07ZG-D in Powderhorn Valley, Colorado
 K07ZL-D in Leavenworth, Washington
 K07ZP-D in Bull Lake Valley, Montana
 K07ZQ-D in Georgetown, Idaho
 K07ZR-DT in Harlowton & Shawmut, Montana
 K07ZU-D in Blanding, Monticello, Utah
 K07ZV-D in Sigurd & Salina, Utah
 K07ZW-D in Marysvale, Utah
 K07ZX-D in Woodland & Kamas, Utah
 K07ZY-D in Beaver, etc., Utah
 K07ZZ-D in East Price, Utah
 K07AAA-D in Helper, Utah
 K07AAB-D in Roosevelt, etc., Utah
 K07AAD-D in Fort Worth, Texas
 K07AAF-D in Corsicana, Texas
 K07AAI-D in Reno, Nevada
 K07AAN-D in Santa Maria, California
 K11WZ-D in Delta Junction, etc., Alaska
 K15KB-D in Squaw Valley, Oregon
 K15KE-D in Klamath Falls, etc., Oregon
 K48EK-D in Long Valley Junction, Utah
 KBNZ-LD in Bend, Oregon
 KDHU-LD in Houston, Texas
 KHXL-LD in Huntsville, Texas
 KJJC-LD in Helena, Montana
 KJUN-CD in Morgan City, Louisiana
 KMNF-LD in St. James, Minnesota
 KOTR-LD in Monterey, California
 KPPI-LD in Garapan/Saipan, Northern Marianas
 KZTC-LD in San Diego, California
 W07BP-D in Ocala, Florida
 W07DC-D in Allentown/Bethlehem, Pennsylvania
 W07DD-D in Champaign, Illinois
 W07DS-D in Burnsville, North Carolina
 W07DT-D in Tryon & Columbus, North Carolina
 WCDN-LD in Cleveland, Ohio
 WCHU-LD in Oakwood Hills, Illinois
 WHFL-CD in Goldsboro, North Carolina
 WKIN-CD in Weber County, Virginia/Kingsport, Tennessee

The following low-power stations, which are no longer licensed, formerly broadcast on analog or digital channel 7:
 K07AG in Aguilar, Colorado
 K07CY in Vernal, etc., Utah
 K07GY in Beaver, etc., Utah
 K07HK in Hoehne, Colorado
 K07KT in Canyonville, etc., Oregon
 K07ND in Healy, Alaska
 K07BK in Grace, etc., Idaho
 K07CM in Panaca, Nevada
 K07DG in Omak, etc., Washington
 K07GD-D in Glenwood Springs, Colorado
 K07IA-D in Oakland, Oregon
 K07IL in Winston, Oregon
 K07IP in Big Sandy, Montana
 K07IX in Happy Camp, California
 K07IZ in Fish Lake Resort, Utah
 K07JC in Indian Springs, Nevada
 K07JZ in Escalante, Utah
 K07KD in Checkerboard, etc., Montana
 K07LO in Forsyth, Montana
 K07NH in Ridgecrest, etc., California
 K07NI in Jeffrey City, Wyoming
 K07NS in Helper, Utah
 K07NV in Hanna, etc., Utah
 K07OP in Emmonak, Alaska
 K07OQ in East Price, Utah
 K07OV in Green River, Utah
 K07PG-D in Seward, Alaska
 K07PH in Le Chee, etc., Arizona
 K07PX in Rockville, Utah
 K07QK in Rosebud, etc., Montana
 K07QM in Bridgeport, etc., California
 K07QS in Glennallen, Alaska
 K07QU-D in Shaktoolik, Alaska
 K07QV-D in Hoonah, Alaska
 K07QW in Koliganek, Alaska
 K07QY in Ouzinkie, Alaska
 K07QZ in Chistochina, Alaska
 K07RC-D in Fort Yukon, Alaska
 K07RE in Anvik, Alaska
 K07RF in Haines, Alaska
 K07RV in Iliamna, Alaska
 K07RZ-D in Crooked Creek, Alaska
 K07SC in Hildale, etc., Utah
 K07SI in Whales Pass, Alaska
 K07SO in Port Moller, Alaska
 K07SP in Tetlin, Alaska
 K07SQ in Mentasta Lake, Alaska
 K07SR in Scammon Bay, Alaska
 K07TA in Santa Maria, California
 K07TJ in McGrath, Alaska
 K07TT in Levelock, Alaska
 K07UF in Abilene, Texas
 K07US in Samak, Utah
 K07UZ in Riverton, etc., Wyoming
 K07VE in Ticaboo, Utah
 K07VH-D in Sargents, Colorado
 K07VI in Challis, Idaho
 K07VL in Utahn, Utah
 K07YT in Mexican Hat, Utah
 K07YW in Bluff, Utah
 K07ZB-D in Mendenhall Valley, Alaska
 K07ZC-D in Ellensburg/Kittitas, Washington
 K07ZF in Calexico, California
 KASC-LP in Atascadero, California
 KETX-LP in Livingston, Texas
 KFLZ-CA in San Antonio, Texas
 KNHB-LP in Uvalde, Texas
 W07BA in Syracuse-Dewitt, New York
 W07BI in Schroon Lake, New York
 W07CL in Auburn, Indiana
 W07DB in Marquette, Michigan
 W07DN-D in Wardensville, etc., West Virginia
 WCBZ-LP in Baton Rouge, Louisiana
 WMGM-LP in Atlantic City, etc., New Jersey
 WNGA-LD in Salisbury, Maryland
 WRDH-LP in Ashton, Illinois
 WWJT-LP in Philadelphia, Pennsylvania

References

07 low-power